The 1997–98 Ukrainian Second League was the seventh season of 3rd level professional football in Ukraine. The competition commenced on 31 July 1997 and ended on 29 June 1998.

Group A

Promoted teams
 Tsementnyk-Khorda Mykolaiv - Runner-up of the Amateur League (debut)
 Naftovyk Dolyna - Third of the Amateur League (debut)
 Dynamo-3 Kyiv - Group 3 third of the Amateur League (debut)
 Berkut Bedevlia - Group 1 last of the Amateur League (debut)
 Borysfen Boryspil - undetermined  (previously another team FC Boryspil played at the level in 1993–94)
 Karpaty-2 Lviv - undetermined (debut)

Relegated teams
 Podillia Khmelnytskyi - Placed 22nd in the First League (returning, last time in 1989 (Soviet Union))
 Veres Rivne - Placed 23rd in the First League (returning, last time in 1989 (Soviet Union))
 Krystal Chortkiv - Placed 24th in the First League (debut)

Location map

Final standings

Top goalscorers

Group B

Promoted teams
 Chornomorets Sevastopol - Fourth of the Amateur League (returning, last time as Chayka Sevastopol in 1995–96)
 Dynamo Odessa - undetermined (returning, last time as Dynamo-Flesh in 1995–96)
 SKA-Lotto Odesa - undetermined (debut)
 Fortuna Sharhorod - undetermined  (debut)
 Dnipro-2 Dnipropetrovsk - undetermined (debut)
 Zirka-NIBAS-2 Kirovohrad - undetermined (debut)

Relegated teams
 SC Odesa - Placed 21st in the First League (returning, last time as SKA Odesa in 1991 (Soviet Union))

Location map

Final standings

Group C

Promoted teams
 Elektron Romny - Winner of the Amateur League (debut)
 Metalurh Komsomolske - Fifth of the Amateur League (debut)
 Pivdenstal Yenakieve - Sixth of the Amateur League (debut)
 Slovianets Konotop - Group 3 runner-up of the Amateur League (debut)
 Avers Bakhmach - Group 5 runner-up of the Amateur League (debut)
 Vorskla-2 Poltava - undetermined (debut)
 Hirnyk Pavlohrad - undetermined (returning, last time as Hirnyk-Kosmos Pavlohrad in 1995–96)
 Metalurh-2 Donetsk - undetermined (debut)

Location map

Final standings

Post season play-offs

Promotion play-offs

Relegation play-offs

|}

Relegation play-offs (1st leg)

Zirka-2 Kirovohrad won on walkover after Kharchovyk Popivka withdrew from the play-offs.

Relegation play-offs (2nd leg)

Tysmenytsia won 4–1 on aggregate.

Shakhtar Horlivka won on walkover after Hirnyk Pavlohrad did not arrive.

See also
 1997–98 Ukrainian Top League
 1997–98 Ukrainian First League
 1997–98 Ukrainian Cup
 1997–98 Ukrainian Football Amateur League

External links
 1997–98 Ukrainian Second League. RSSSF

Ukrainian Second League seasons
3
Ukra